Xenocytaea stanislawi is a jumping spider species in the genus Xenocytaea. It was first identified in 2011 by Barbara Maria Patoleta.

Description
The male is slightly smaller than the female.

Distribution
Xenocytaea stanislawi is found in Fiji.

References

Spiders of Fiji
Salticidae
Spiders described in 2011